Thomas Jewett Mabry (October 17, 1884 December 23, 1962) was an American attorney, politician and judge, who was chief justice of the New Mexico Supreme Court (1939–46) and the 14th governor of New Mexico (1947–51).

Career
Mabry attended the University of Oklahoma and the University of New Mexico School of Law. He settled in Clovis, New Mexico, where he practiced law and published the local newspaper. He was a member of the New Mexico Constitutional Convention in 1910.

Mabry held numerous political and judicial posts, including serving in the New Mexico Senate (1912–17); on the Albuquerque City Commission (1926–27); as District Attorney of Albuquerque (1932–36); and as a state district judge (1937–39). From 1939 to 1946, he was chief justice of the New Mexico Supreme Court. He was elected Governor as a Democrat in 1946 and reelected in 1948. In 1917, during his time at the New Mexico Senate, his second wife Katherine Mabry became the one of the first female lawyers in New Mexico.

During Mabry's time as governor, the state was active in several post-World War II initiatives, including creation of state commission on alcoholism and a fair employment practice commission.

Mabry's governorship was notable for his involvement in the "Brushy" Bill Roberts hearing.  "Brushy" Bill Roberts claimed to be the outlaw William H. Bonney, a.k.a. Billy the Kid, and applied for a pardon from crimes Bonney had committed in New Mexico.  Mabry announced the meeting, which was covered by the press.  Mabry announced that he did not believe Roberts' story, and denied the pardon application.  The press attention and the trip from his home in Hico, Texas to Santa Fe had a negative effect on the elderly Roberts' health, and he died soon afterwards.

In retirement, Mabry was a resident of Albuquerque.  He died there on December 23, 1962, and was buried at Fairview Memorial Park in Albuquerque.

External links
Thomas J. Mabry at National Governors Association

Obituary, Thomas Jewett Mabry at Oklahoma Cemeteries
Thomas Jewett Mabry at Political Graveyard

1884 births
1962 deaths
People from Carlisle County, Kentucky
New Mexico state court judges
Democratic Party New Mexico state senators
Democratic Party governors of New Mexico
University of Oklahoma alumni
New Mexico lawyers
Justices of the New Mexico Supreme Court
University of New Mexico School of Law alumni
American Presbyterians
20th-century American judges
People from Hico, Texas
People from Clovis, New Mexico
Chief Justices of the New Mexico Supreme Court
20th-century American politicians
20th-century American lawyers